Giwa Local Government Area is a Local Government Area LGA at Kaduna State, Nigeria. Its headquarters,are in the town of Giwa. The Government Council is chaired, by Abubakar Lawal.

It was created on 15 September 1991, by the then president and the Grand Commander of the Federal Republic of Nigeria, General Ibrahim Badamasi Babangida GCFR, out of Igabi Local Government Area of Kaduna State.

It has an area of 2,066 km and a population of 286,427 at the 2006 census. It has 11 wards which are shika, Idasu, Kadaga, Danmahawayi, Kidandan, Galadimawa, Gangara, Giwa, Kakangi, Pan Hauya and yakawada also with 2 development area Administrative/ Councils. It is located in the North-West of Kaduna State.

The postal code of Giwa Local Government Area LGA is 810.

Economy activities in Giwa 
The major Economy and occupations of the people are agriculture products farming such as onions, tomatoes, water melons and cucumbers. The livestock's farming of caws and rams is also their activities. There is a weekly market known as Giwa market in which different goods and services and sold.

References

Local Government Areas in Kaduna State